Oulodus is a genus of conodonts in the family Prioniodinidae.

O. elegans is found in the Late Silurian to Early Devonian Keyser Formation, a mapped limestone bedrock unit in Pennsylvania, Maryland, Virginia, and West Virginia.

References

External links 

 

Prioniodinida genera
Paleozoic life of Ontario
Paleozoic life of British Columbia
Paleozoic life of the Northwest Territories
Paleozoic life of Quebec
Paleozoic life of Yukon